The Greek National Time Trial Championships have been held since 2000.

Men

U23

See also
Greek National Road Race Championships
National road cycling championships

References

National road cycling championships
Cycle races in Greece
Recurring sporting events established in 2000
2000 establishments in Greece
Cycling